The Alaska Engineering Commission Cottage No. 25 is a historic house at 345 West Third Avenue in Anchorage, Alaska.  It is a two-story wood-frame structure, with a low-pitch gable roof that has wide overhanging eaves with exposed rafter tails.  It was designed and built in 1917 by the Alaska Engineering Commission, a Federal agency charged with building railways in Alaska.  It is one of the second set of such housing built by the commission, and is now owned by Anchorage Historic Properties.

The cottage was listed on the National Register of Historic Places in 1996.

See also
A. E. C. Cottage No. 23
National Register of Historic Places listings in Anchorage, Alaska

References

Houses on the National Register of Historic Places in Alaska
Houses completed in 1917
Houses in Anchorage, Alaska
1917 establishments in Alaska
Bungalow architecture in Alaska
Buildings and structures on the National Register of Historic Places in Anchorage, Alaska